The Civil War Battlefields commemorative coins are a series of commemorative coins which were issued by the United States Mint in 1995.

Legislation 
The Civil War Battlefields Commemorative Coin Act of 1992 authorized the production of three coins, a clad half dollar, a silver dollar, and a gold half eagle, to commemorate the 100th anniversary of the beginning of the protection of Civil War battlefields. The act allowed the coins to be struck in both proof and uncirculated finishes. The coins were released on March 31, 1995.

Designs

Half Dollar
The obverse of the Civil War Battlefields commemorative half dollar, designed by Don Troiani, features a Civil War drummer boy and inscriptions. The reverse, designed by T. James Ferrell, features a battlefield scene.

Dollar
The obverse of the Civil War Battlefields commemorative dollar, designed by Don Troiani, features an infantryman raising a canteen to the lips of a wounded foe. The reverse, designed by John Mercanti, features a quotation from Joshua Lawrence Chamberlain, the college professor from Maine who became one of the heroes of Gettysburg.

Half eagle
The obverse of the Civil War Battlefields commemorative half eagle, designed by Don Troiani, shows a Civil War bugler on horseback sounding out a call to the troops. The reverse, designed by Alfred Maletsky, features the image of a bald eagle holding a banner that reads "Let Us Protect and Preserve".

Specifications 
Half Dollar
 Display Box Color: Dark Green
 Edge: Reeded
 Weight: 11.34 grams
 Diameter: 30.61 millimeters; 1.205 inches
 Composition: 92% Copper, 8% Nickel

Dollar
 Display Box Color: Dark Green
 Edge: Reeded
 Weight: 26.730 grams; 0.8594 troy ounce
 Diameter: 38.10 millimeters; 1.50 inches
 Composition: 90% Silver, 10% Copper

Half Eagle
 Display Box Color: Dark Green
 Edge: Reeded
 Weight: 8.359 grams; 0.2687 troy ounce
 Diameter: 21.59 millimeters; 0.850 inch
 Composition: 90% Gold, 6% Silver, 4% Copper

See also
 United States commemorative coins
 List of United States commemorative coins and medals (1990s)
 Battle of Gettysburg half dollar
 Battle of Antietam half dollar
 Stone Mountain Memorial half dollar

References

1995 establishments in the United States
Modern United States commemorative coins
American Civil War